is a Japanese retired professional wrestler better known by the ring name . Amano made her debut for JWP Joshi Puroresu in December 1994 and early on began also making appearances for the Gaea Japan promotion, where she most notably became one of the four founding members of the Oz Academy stable. Amano joined Gaea Japan full-time in 2002 and remained with the promotion until its folding in 2005, becoming a one-time AAAW Tag Team Champion. Afterwards, Amano began working for Oz Academy, now a full-time promotion, where she went on to become a two-time Oz Academy Openweight Champion and a three-time Oz Academy Tag Team Champion. Amano retired from professional wrestling in August 2014.

Professional wrestling career

JWP and Gaea Japan (1994–2005)
Amano made her debut under her real name for the JWP Joshi Puroresu on December 4, 1994, when she faced another debutante, Tomoko Miyaguchi, in a singles match. Early on in her career, Amano also began making regular appearances for the Gaea Japan promotion, where, during the summer of 1997, she, Mayumi Ozaki, Chikayo Nagashima and Sugar Sato formed a villainous stable named Oz Academy. On December 8, 1997, Amano also ventured into the world of mixed martial arts, when she took part in an event held by Central Martial Arts Association. Amano won her only MMA fight, when her opponent, Yoko Takahashi, was disqualified for illegally kicking her in the head. Amano won her first championship back in her home promotion, when she and Command Bolshoi defeated Hikari Fukuoka and Tomoko Kuzumi for the JWP Tag Team Championship on January 15, 1999. During the reign, Amano began working under the new ring name "Carlos Amano". After a thirteen-month reign, they lost the title to ZAP I and ZAP T on February 10, 2000. Later that same year, Amano quit JWP to first become a freelancer, continuing to make appearances for Gaea Japan. In November 2002, Amano officially joined Gaea Japan, making the promotion her new home. Amano also made appearances for independent events held by Mayumi Ozaki under the Oz Academy banner, most notably winning the ¥10,000,000,000 Iron Woman Tournament on August 8, 2004, defeating Aja Kong in the finals. On September 20, 2004, Amano won her only title in Gaea Japan, when she and Manami Toyota defeated Aja Kong and Amazing Kong for the AAAW Tag Team Championship. After a six-month reign, they lost the title to Ran Yu-Yu, the former Tomoko Miyaguchi, and Toshie Uematsu, just days before the folding of Gaea Japan. At the promotion's final event on April 10, 2005, Amano was defeated by Aja Kong in a singles match.

Oz Academy (2005–2014)
Following the folding of Gaea Japan, Amano joined Oz Academy, which Mayumi Ozaki had now turned into a full promotion. Despite being one of the founding members of the Oz Academy stable in Gaea Japan, since 2005, Amano has mainly worked as a member of the Oz Seikigun ("regular army"), opposing the villainous stable, led by Ozaki. In early 2006, Amano, along with several other Oz Academy workers, made her first trip to Mexico, taking part in events held by AAA. Amano returned to AAA in early 2008 to take part in the Reina de Reinas Universal Tournament, from which she was eliminated by Estrellita. On January 13, 2008, Amano defeated Aja Kong to become the second Oz Academy Openweight Champion. The following July, Amano and Dynamite Kansai defeated Chikayo Nagashima and Sonoko Kato to become the inaugural Oz Academy Tag Team Champions. However, Amano's and Kansai's reign lasted less than a month, before they lost the title to D-Fix (Kaoru and Mayumi Ozaki). After a reign of 364 days, Amano lost the Oz Academy Openweight Championship to Mayumi Ozaki on January 11, 2009. Amano regained the title from Manami Toyota on September 21, 2009, and on May 2, 2010, once again became a double champion, when she and Toyota won the Oz Academy Tag Team Championship from Akino and Ran Yu-Yu. After another month-long reign, Amano and Toyota lost the title to Aja Kong and Kaoru Ito. On July 11, 2010, Amano also lost the Oz Academy Openweight Championship to Kaoru. Amano and Toyota won the Oz Academy Tag Team Championship once more on June 26, 2011, by defeating Hiroyo Matsumoto and Tomoka Nakagawa. After a seven-month reign, they lost the title to Aja Kong and Sonoko Kato on January 15, 2012. On August 17, 2014, while recovering from a knee injury, Amano announced that she would be following her doctor's advice and retiring from professional wrestling due to damage to her brainstem. Her official retirement ceremony took place on April 15, 2015.

Championships and accomplishments
Gaea Japan
AAAW Tag Team Championship (1 time) – with Manami Toyota
High Spurt 600 Tournament (2004)
JWP Joshi Puroresu
JWP Tag Team Championship (1 time) – with Command Bolshoi
JDStar
TWF World Tag Team Championship (1 time) – with Kamen Tenshi Rosetta
Ladies Legend Pro-Wrestling
LLPW Six Woman Tag Team Championship (1 time) – with Keiko Aono and Mizuki Endo
Oz Academy
Oz Academy Openweight Championship (2 times)
Oz Academy Tag Team Championship (3 times) – with Dynamite Kansai (1) and Manami Toyota (2)
Iron Woman Singles Tournament (2004)
Happening Award (2014)
Impact Award (2014)

Luchas de Apuestas record

Mixed martial arts record

|-
|Win
|align=center| 1–0
|
|DQ (illegal soccer kick)
|CMA: Octagon Challenge
|
|align=center| 1
|align=center| 17:25
|Nagoya, Japan
|

Footnotes

References

External links
Oz Academy profile 
Puroresu Central profile

1976 births
20th-century professional wrestlers
21st-century professional wrestlers
Living people
Japanese female mixed martial artists
Mixed martial artists utilizing wrestling
Japanese female professional wrestlers
Sportspeople from Shizuoka Prefecture
People from Shimizu, Shizuoka
Oz Academy Openweight Champions
Oz Academy Tag Team Champions
AAAW Tag Team Champions